Ovidiu Melniciuc (born 16 January 1994) is a Romanian rugby union player. He plays in the fly-half position for amateur SuperLiga club Cluj. He also plays for Romania's national team the Oaks.

References

External links

1994 births
Living people
Romanian rugby union players
Romania international rugby union players
Rugby union fly-halves